Suzy Amis Cameron (born Susan Elizabeth Amis; January 5, 1962) is an American environmental advocate, and a former actress and model. Her acting career began in 1985, known for roles in The Ballad of Little Jo, The Usual Suspects and Titanic. Since retiring from acting in 1998, she has advocated veganism, sustainability, and climate change awareness. She is the co-founder of MUSE School, an all-vegan primary and secondary education school, and of Cameron Family Farms and Food Forest Organics, a vegan café. She has also organized environmental initiatives to promote sustainable fashion and environment-friendly dieting.

Career
Born in Oklahoma City, Oklahoma, Amis Cameron worked as a Ford model before she began acting in the 1980s. She made her feature-film debut in the 1985 comedy film Fandango. Amis Cameron next had roles in Rocket Gibraltar (1988), Where the Heart Is (1990), and Rich in Love (1993). In 1993, she appeared as Josephine "Jo" Monaghan in The Ballad of Little Jo. She later appeared in Blown Away (1994), The Usual Suspects (1995), and the blockbuster Titanic (1997), in which she played Lizzy Calvert, the granddaughter of Rose Dawson Calvert (Gloria Stuart). That same year, she starred in the Western Last Stand at Saber River and acted in the cult-classic Nadja. Amis Cameron retired from acting after her last screen appearance in the 1998 film Judgment Day.

In 2005, Amis Cameron co-founded MUSE School CA, a Reggio-inspired, independent, nonprofit school in the Calabasas, California, area north of Los Angeles, with her sister, Rebecca Amis, reported as the country's first vegan K-12 school with a 100% plant-based lunch program. Additionally, the school is zero waste and 100% solar powered, with Solar Sun Flowers designed by her husband, James Cameron.

In 2009, Amis Cameron founded Red Carpet Green Dress, a global initiative showcasing sustainable fashion on the red carpet at the Oscars. Collaborating with fashion brands such as Armani, Vivienne Westwood, and Reformation, the gowns and tuxedos have included vintage, recycled, repurposed and eco design. Previous campaign ambassadors include Emma Roberts, Priyanka Bose, Naomie Harris, Olga Kurylenko, Kellan Lutz, Sophie Turner, and Missi Pyle.

In 2014, Amis Cameron co-founded, with her husband, director James Cameron, and Craig McCaw, Plant Power Task Force, an organization focused on showing the impact of animal agriculture on climate change and the environment. Plant Power Task Force supported the first multi-country studies on global diets and climate change by the independent U.K.-based think tank, Chatham House: Livestock—Climate Change's Forgotten Sector and Changing Diets, Changing Climate. They also spearheaded the MyPlate MyPlanet initiative in spring 2015, a platform for hundreds of environmental and health organizations in support of linking health and the environment in the U.S. Dietary Guidelines.

In fall 2018, Amis Cameron published the vegan advocacy cookbook, OMD: Swap One Meal a Day to Get Healthy, Live Longer, and Save the Planet, with Simon & Schuster's Atria Publishing Group; in 2019, the paperback edition, The OMD Plan: Swap One Meal a Day to Save Your Health and Save the Planet, was published. The OMD Plan was featured on Oprah Winfrey's Super Soul Sunday in Fall 2019. The book inspired Oprah Winfrey to eat one plant-based meal a day.

Amis Cameron also launched the OMD campaign to promote plant-based food solutions to climate change, a multi-pronged effort to transform eating habits and the food system.

She also is a founder of Cameron Family Farms and Food Forest Organics, a plant-based café and market in New Zealand. Her farm in New Zealand supports regenerative agriculture using 500-600 cattle livestock to improve the soil and help carbon sequestration. In an interview with NZ media the Cameron couple assured the audience that his was merely a pathway for other NZ farmers in their eventual transition, for the planet, to plant based agriculture, without livestock. A vegan diet is, she explained, a healthier choice, despite their use of cattle on their land. A shortage of foreign labour during lockdown was another reason for keeping on the cattle, instead of making the transition to plant based agriculture as she and James Cameron had planned. Amis Cameron later decried that anyone who didn't believe in her views was a 'disposable deplorable' and should not complain when they suffer inevitable pain.

Personal life
In 1986, she married actor Sam Robards, her co-star in Fandango, and son of Lauren Bacall and Jason Robards. Their marriage produced a son, Jasper, before their divorce in 1994.

Amis and James Cameron met while filming Titanic, but the latter returned to his partner Linda Hamilton and married her in 1997, divorcing two years later with Hamilton receiving a settlement of $50 million. Amis and Cameron married on June 4, 2000. They have two daughters, Claire and Elizabeth, and a son, James Quinn (who is known by his middle name). In 2020, they became permanent guardians of one of their daughter's teenage friends.

In 2012, Amis and Cameron adopted a plant-based diet after watching the film Forks Over Knives. They live on an organic farm in Hollister Ranch. They are featured in Eating You Alive, a 2016 American documentary.

Filmography

See also
 List of vegans

References

External links

 
 
 

1962 births
Female models from Oklahoma
20th-century American actresses
American television actresses
Living people
Actresses from Oklahoma City
American film actresses
American veganism activists
James Cameron
Plant-based diet advocates